The Executive Order 12711 was issued by American president George H. W. Bush on 11 April 1990. It deferred deportation of Chinese nationals and their direct dependents who were in the US between 5 June 1989 and 11 April 1990, waived the 2-year home country residency requirement, and gave them employment authorization through 1 January 1994.

It was issued as part of the international backlash against the People's Republic of China (PRC) in response for its suppression of the 1989 Tiananmen Square protests and massacre that occurred 4 June of that year.  It was made permanent when the Chinese Student Protection Act was passed in 1992.

See also
 Chinese American history

References

External links
 Executive Order 12711 - Policy Implementation With Respect to Nationals of the People's Republic of China, The American Presidency Project, April 11, 1990

12711
History of the foreign relations of the United States
1989 Tiananmen Square protests and massacre
1990 in international relations
1990 in law
1990 in the United States
China–United States relations